Lake of Bays is a large lake in the District Municipality of Muskoka in Central Ontario, Canada. It is located almost entirely in the Township municipality of Lake of Bays, which is named after the lake, with the exception of the southwest arm of the lake which is in the Town of Huntsville. Ontario Highway 35 runs north and east of the lake.

Port Cunnington is a community established on a peninsula reaching out deep inside the lake. Other settlements on the lake shore include Dwight, South Portage, Baysville  and Dorset.

Geographic features
The lake is fed by Oxtongue River, as well as other rivers and creeks flowing from the north-east (Boyne River and its tributary Sixteen Mile Creek, Ten Mile Creek, Hollow River, St. Mary Creek).

Bigwin Island is the largest island in the lake; other islands include Burnt Island, Fairview Island, Langmaids Island, Pancake Island, Raynor Island, Rock Island, Haystack Island, Millichamp Island, Reuben Island, Crown Island and Peanut Island. The irregular shape of the lake is defined by many bays such as Rabbit's Bay, Burnt Island Bay, Whitehouse Bay, Montgomery Bay, Portage Bay, Haystack Bay, Ten Mile Bay, Dwight Bay, Trading Bay and Murky Bay.

Origin of Name
The First Nations apparently called the lake Num g e low e nee g go mark lak a hagan which means Lake of Forks.  It was also known as Baptiste Lake, Forked Lake and Lake of Two Bays.  In 1837, David Thompson traversed the lake and drew a map of the lake that refers to it as Forked Lake.  On September 5, 1837, Thompson mentioned catching lake trout in the lake.  Thomas Moffatt, an agent for the Hudson’s Bay Company (Moffatt reported an outpost on Bigwin Island) referred to it as Trading Lake.  In 1853, a geological survey by Alexander Murray of the Geological Survey of Canada referred to the lake as Lake of Bays.

Amenities
Due to the many bays and large size of the lake, a number of amenities have appeared around the lake including lodges, resorts, campgrounds, and golf clubs.

Lake Characteristics
Lake of Bays is a deep, cold, infertile lake which forms an important part of the Muskoka watershed. Despite its size and basin shape, low fertility and a short residence time combine to make it only moderately productive.

Fish Species
There are many fish species in Lake of Bays.  Those known to exist are:
Lake trout
Brook trout
Rainbow trout
Northern pike
Pumpkinseed
Rock bass
Smallmouth bass
Largemouth bass
Cisco
Whitefish
Lake herring
White sucker
Longnose sucker
Burbot
Yellow perch
Trout-perch
Rainbow smelt
Brown bullhead
Fathead minnow
Bluntnose minnow
Common shiner
Blacknose shiner
Northern redbelly dace
Brook stickleback
Northern pearl dace
Creek chub

Fishing
Lake of Bays is fished by cottagers, local residents and many visitors to the area.  Lake trout and smallmouth bass are the main sport species and the lake has produced a number of trophy lake trout in excess of 20 pounds.  These trout are difficult to catch, and require heavy trolling equipment once the lake warms up. Smallmouth bass are often found in the shallower water around the shores and on shoals.  During the winter, the lake provides fishing for lake trout,  whitefish, smelts, and burbot.

See also
List of lakes in Ontario
Official Community Website for Lake of Bays, Hillside | Oxtongue Lake | Dwight

Pictures

References

External links
Lake of Bays township

Lakes of the District Municipality of Muskoka